If you are looking for the origin of the term, see Encore. 

Encore! Encore! is an American sitcom television series created by David Angell, Peter Casey, David Lee, Chuck Ranberg and Anne Flett-Giordano, starring Nathan Lane as an opera singer. On the verge of becoming "The Fourth Tenor", Lane's character injures his vocal cords and must move in with his family, who run a vineyard in Northern California. The series premiered on NBC on September 22, 1998 and ended on January 27, 1999.

Encore! Encore! struggled in the ratings from the start. After its fourth episode aired on October 27, 1998, NBC put the series on hiatus for almost two months. Thirteen episodes were ordered but the series was cancelled at midseason with two episodes left unaired. The final network episode aired on January 27, 1999. All 13 episodes later ran on Bravo.

Cast
 Nathan Lane as Joseph Pinoni
 Joan Plowright as Marie Pinoni
 Glenne Headly as Franceseca Pinoni
 Trevor Fehrman as Michael Pinoni
 Ernie Sabella as Leo Wodecki
 James Patrick Stuart as Claude Bertrand

Episodes

Critical reception
A New York Observer review described the show as "the 'Moose Murders' of sitcoms -- it won't be here past Halloween, but the recollection of its awfulness will give you untold delight for years to come." In contrast, the New York Times gave a very positive review to the show's debut, saying it possessed the "most accomplished, high-powered cast on television."

References

External links
 
 

1998 American television series debuts
1999 American television series endings
1990s American sitcoms
English-language television shows
NBC original programming
Television shows set in California
Television series by CBS Studios